Sulphur Springs Municipal Airport  is a city-owned, public-use airport located two nautical miles (4 km) northwest of the central business district of Sulphur Springs, a city in Hopkins County, Texas, United States. It is included in the National Plan of Integrated Airport Systems for 2011–2015, which categorized it as a general aviation facility.

It was named Texas Airport of the Year for 2003 by the Texas Department of Transportation Aviation Division.

Facilities and aircraft 
Sulphur Springs Municipal Airport covers an area of 197 acres (80 ha) at an elevation of 489 feet (149 m) above mean sea level. It has one runway designated 1/19 with a concrete surface measuring 5,001 by 75 feet (1,524 x 23 m).

For the 12-month period ending March 7, 2009, the airport had 17,910 aircraft operations, an average of 49 per day: 97% general aviation, 3% military, and <1% air taxi. At that time there were 74 aircraft based at this airport: 88% single-engine, 8% multi-engine, 1% jet, 1% helicopter, and 1% ultralight.

References

External links 
 Sulphur Springs Airport (City of Sulphur Springs website)
  at Texas DOT airport directory
 Aerial image as of February 1995 from USGS The National Map
 

Airports in Texas
Transportation in Hopkins County, Texas
Buildings and structures in Hopkins County, Texas